Cairo Metro Line 2 is the second line of the Cairo Metro in Cairo, Egypt.

History
Cairo's metro network was greatly expanded in the mid-1990s with the building of Line 2 (red), from Shoubra-El-Kheima to Cairo University, with an extension to Giza.

It is the first line in history to have a tunnel going under the Nile.
Extending  with 20 stations, it is sometimes called the "Japanese-Built Line". It is mostly in bored tunnel, with two exceptions: a short section at the northern end approaching Shubra El-Kheima which is elevated, and a section just south of this by cut-and-cover. The main difference between Lines 1 and 2 is that Line 1 uses an overhead line while Line 2 uses the third-rail system. The construction of the line was finished in October 2000 and was later extended to El Mounib. The communication for line 2 was provided by Alcatel in 2005.

Total project cost was 761 million euros.

After the 2011 Egyptian revolution, the station "Mubarak" has been renamed and is now called "Al-Shohadaa" (Arabic for "martyrs").

 October 1996 Shobra - Mubarak (now:"Al-Shohadaa"), 
 Sept 1998: Mubarak (now:"Al-Shohadaa") - Sadat, 
 April 19, 1999: Sadat - Cairo University,  (including crossing of the Nile)
 October 8, 2000: Cairo University - Giza Suburban 
 January 17, 2005: Omm el Misryeen - Monib

Connections

To other Metro lines
Line 2 connects to Line 1 at Shohadaa and Sadat Stations, and with Line 3 at Attaba Station.

To other forms of transit
Shohadaa Station is immediately next to Ramses Station, providing access to Egyptian National Railways long-haul and short-haul domestic passenger service. Cairo Transport Authority buses and private microbus services are also nearby.

Access to Cairo International Airport is expected via transfer to Line 3 upon completion of Phase 4 in early 2020.

See also
List of Cairo Metro stations

References

Cairo Metro
Railway lines opened in 1996